The Subterraneans is a 1958 novella by Beat Generation author Jack Kerouac. It is a semi-fictional account of his short romance with Alene Lee (1931–1991), an African-American woman, in Greenwich Village, New York. It was the first work of Kerouac’s to be released following the success of On the Road. The Subterraneans and its following novel,The Dharma Bums, both proved to be popular when released in 1958, and are now seen as important works of the Beat Literature. A Hollywood film adaptation would be released in 1960.

Background 
Kerouac met Alene in the late summer of 1953 when she was typing up the manuscripts of William Burroughs and Allen Ginsberg, in Ginsberg's Lower East Side apartment.
 In the novella, Kerouac moved the story from New York City to San Francisco and renamed Alene Lee "Mardou Fox". She is described as a carefree spirit who frequents the jazz clubs and bars of the budding Beat scene of San Francisco. Other well-known personalities and friends from the author's life also appear thinly disguised in the novel. The character Frank Carmody is based on William S. Burroughs, and Adam Moorad on Allen Ginsberg.  Even Gore Vidal appears as successful novelist Arial Lavalina. Kerouac's alter ego is named Leo Percepied, and his long-time friend Neal Cassady is mentioned only in passing as Leroy.

Character key
Kerouac often based his fictional characters on friends and family.

Criticism and literary significance
The position of jazz and jazz culture is central to the novel, tying together the themes of Kerouac's writing here as elsewhere, and expressed in the "spontaneous prose" style in which he composed most of his works.  The following quotation from Chapter 1 illustrates the spontaneous prose style of The Subterraneans:

Film version

A 1960 film adaptation was release by Metro-Goldwyn-Mayer to capitalize on the book’s success. The producers changed the African American character of Mardou Fox, Kerouac's love interest, to a young French girl (played by Leslie Caron) to better fit both contemporary social and Hollywood palates. While it was derided and vehemently criticized by Allen Ginsberg, among others, for its two-dimensional characters, it illustrates the way the film industry attempted to exploit the emerging popularity of this culture as it grew in San Francisco and Greenwich Village, New York.

References

1958.  The Subterraneans,

Further reading
 O'Sullivan, S., 'Alene Lee: Subterranean Muse', in Wills, D. (ed.) Beatdom Vol. 4 (Mauling Press: Dundee, 2009) p. 20

Fiction set in 1953
1958 American novels
American novels adapted into films
Novels by Jack Kerouac
Novels set in New York City
Underground culture